Trick Bag is the seventh studio album by the funk group The Meters. The name comes from their cover of the Earl King single of the same name.

Background
In spring of 1976 the band was on tour opening for the Rolling Stones on their Tour of Europe '76. According to Jason Berry's Up from the Cradle of Jazz, several tracks on this album are preliminary recordings and were selected for release in the absence of band members.

Reception
Stephen Erlewine had a negative view and critiqued the album's attempt to sound mainstream. He singles out three tracks as exceptions: "Mister Moon", "Doodle Loop" and "Honky Tonk Women". Joe McEwen of Rolling Stones critiqued the song choices and the attempt to please the commercial market. He said two tracks are in-line with the band's style: "Doodle Loop" and "Chug-a-Lug", and had a positive view of the title track "Trick Bag". Robert Christgau also critiqued the song choices and had a positive view of the title track.

Track listing

Personnel
Credits adapted from AllMusic.

Ziggy Modeliste – drums
Art Neville – keyboards, vocals
Cyril Neville – congas, percussion, vocals
Leo Nocentelli – guitar, backing vocals
George Porter Jr. – bass guitar
Kenneth "Afro" Williams – percussion 
Tony Owens – backing vocals
Terry Smith – backing vocals
Earl King – father's vocals (track 7)

Production
The Meters – producer
Allen Toussaint – producer
Bob Irwin – mastering
Bill Dahl – liner notes
Rich Russell – design
Ed Thrasher – art direction
Michael P. Smith – photography
Tom Copi – photography

References

1976 albums
The Meters albums
Albums produced by Allen Toussaint
Reprise Records albums